The 2012 Nippon Professional Baseball season is the 63rd season since the NPB was reorganized in 1950.

Regular season standings

Climax Series

Note: All of the games that are played in the first two rounds of the Climax Series are held at the higher seed's home stadium. The team with the higher regular-season standing also advances if the round ends in a tie.

First stage
The regular season league champions, the Hokkaido Nippon-Ham Fighters (PL) and the Yomiuri Giants (CL), received byes to the championship round.

Central League

Pacific League

Final stage
The regular season league champions, the Hokkaido Nippon-Ham Fighters (PL) and the Yomiuri Giants (CL), received a one-game advantage.

Central League

Pacific League

Japan Series

League leaders

Central League

Pacific League

See also
2012 Korea Professional Baseball season
2012 Major League Baseball season

References